Nida Manzoor is a British television writer and director. She is best known for directing two episodes of Doctor Who and creating the Peacock/Channel 4 comedy show We Are Lady Parts, for which she won the 2021 Rose d'Or Emerging Talent Award. Her debut feature film, Polite Society, was announced in 2022.

Early life
Manzoor grew up in a Pakistani Muslim family. Her family lived in Singapore until she was 10, later moving to London. Manzoor attended St James School.

She was raised in a musical household, and was bought her first guitar by her father when she was 8. Manzoor has described music as her 'first passion', and is quoted as saying "I wanted to be a brown girl Bob Dylan before I wanted to do screenwriting." She also started writing at a young age. Manzoor describes being encouraged by her grandfather, who kept anything she wrote in a file.

Manzoor's childhood influences included Jackie Chan films, the Coen Brothers, Edgar Wright, and old Hollywood cinema.

She graduated from University College London (UCL) with a degree in Politics in 2011.  While at university, Manzoor was involved in UCL's Film Society. Manzoor's family had expected her to do a Law conversion course and become a human rights lawyer, but she convinced them to allow her to pursue a career in filmmaking.

Career 
Manzoor started her film career working as a runner in Soho. She went on to obtain jobs as a screenwriter, working for the CBBC. After early shorts like Layla and Arcade, Manzoor wrote episodes for Dixi and Jamillah and Aladdin in 2016.

Manzoor's first directing role was on the first series of Enterprice, released 2018. In 2018, she was also commissioned to make a pilot episode (entitled "Lady Parts") for what would become We Are Lady Parts. Manzoor wrote and directed the episode. After the episode was screened, there was substantial backlash leading Manzoor to close her social media accounts. She also directed a comedy pilot, Hounslow Diaries, which was screened on BBC Three in 2018.

She directed two episodes of Doctor Who, "Fugitive of the Judoon" and "Nikola Tesla's Night of Terror", shown in 2020.

We Are Lady Parts proceeded to a full series in 2021, written, directed and executive produced by Manzoor. She has said the series is somewhat autobiographical. She has cited This is Spinal Tap and The Young Ones as influences for the series. Manzoor co-wrote the music with her siblings Shez Manzoor and Sanya Manzoor, and with her brother-in-law Benjamin 'Benni' Fregin. A soundtrack album from the series was released digitally. The show was renewed for a second series in November 2021.

As of 2021, Manzoor is part of the Pillars Artist Fellowship Advisory Board.

Production on Manzoor's debut feature film, Polite Society, was completed in early 2022. The film stars Priya Kansara and Ritu Arya, and will be distributed internationally by Universal Pictures.

Awards and recognition
In 2015, Manzoor was named among Broadcast Magazines Hot Shots for her short film 7.2. Manzoor won best Director in Comedy Drama/Situation Comedy from the Royal Television Society Craft & Design Awards 2019 for her work on Enterprice. In November 2021, Manzoor was awarded the 2021 Rose d'Or Emerging Talent Award for her work on Lady Parts.

Filmography

Film

Television

References

External links 
 

Living people
Alumni of University College London
Year of birth missing (living people)
British women television writers